Martin Hristov Dimov (born 5 October 1984) is a Bulgarian footballer . In 2013, he moved to northern Norway to play for the amateur team Sandnessjøen IL.

References

1984 births
Living people
Bulgarian footballers
Bulgarian expatriate footballers
Association football defenders
First Professional Football League (Bulgaria) players
PFC Spartak Varna players
FC Etar 1924 Veliko Tarnovo players
PFC Svetkavitsa players
Expatriate footballers in Norway
Bulgarian expatriate sportspeople in Norway